Bomere Heath is a village in Shropshire, England, which lies north of the county town of Shrewsbury and between Baschurch and Harlescott. It is situated between the A528 road and Berwick Road. The village has a primary school.

It is the main village of the Pimhill parish. The parish is now known as "Bomere Heath and District". Nearby, to the north, is the small village of Merrington.

The village has a few shops including a Co-op food store, a barber's shop, a post office, pub and a fish and chip restaurant.

Education
The village now has Bomere Heath C of E primary school. Around 140 pupils attend. The headteacher, Mrs Julie Ball, aims to make this school as welcoming as possible for any new pupils.

Sport 
The village has a Cricket Club playing in the Shropshire County Cricket League. In June 2016 it celebrated its 50th anniversary. At the end of the 2016 season the team finished third from bottom of the Premier Division and they were relegated to Division One. However the villagers finished the 2017 season as Division One champions to gain a return to the Premier Division.

The village has a Sunday football team which reformed in August 2015.

References

External links

Bomere Heath Local History "Squatters to commuters" Website

Villages in Shropshire